Datuk Hajjah Norah binti Abdul Rahman (born 4 October 1959) is a former Malaysian politician. She was the Member of the Parliament of Malaysia for the Tanjong Manis constituency in Sarawak from 2008 until 2018, representing the United Traditional Bumiputera Party (PBB) in the governing Barisan Nasional coalition.

Norah is the daughter of former Sarawak Chief Minister and Governor Abdul Rahman Ya'kub. Before entering politics, she was a businesswoman. She was elected to Parliament unopposed in the 2008 election, replacing Wahab Dolah as the PBB's nominee for the Tanjong Manis seat. She was re-elected in 2013, winning almost 90% of votes cast to defeat a Pan-Malaysian Islamic Party (PAS) candidate. She did not re-contest the seat in the 2018 election.

Election results

References

Living people
1959 births
Malaysian Muslims
Members of the Dewan Rakyat
People from Sarawak
Parti Pesaka Bumiputera Bersatu politicians
Women members of the Dewan Rakyat
Women in Sarawak politics